Longchaeus acus, common name the needle pyram, is a species of sea snail, a marine gastropod mollusk in the family Pyramidellidae, the pyrams and their allies.

Description

The shell is polished. Its color is white, with dark chestnut or chocolate spots, usually arranged in three revolving series on the whorls of the teleoconch and five series on the body whorl. The columella is three-plaited with the upper plait largest. The lip is sometimes lirate within. The peripheral groove becomes in this species either obsolete or indicated by a slight angle.  The length of the shell varies between 19 mm and 67 mm.

Distribution
This marine species occurs in the Indo-W Pacific (Red Sea, Tanzania, Madagascar,  Mauritius, Mascarene Basin  and in South East Asia, in Vietnam and Philippines).

References

 Okutani T., ed. (2000) Marine mollusks in Japan. Tokai University Press. 1173 pp. page(s): 703

External links
 To Biodiversity Heritage Library (12 publications)
 To Encyclopedia of Life
 To USNM Invertebrate Zoology Mollusca Collection
 To World Register of Marine Species
 

Pyramidellidae
Gastropods described in 1791
Taxa named by Johann Friedrich Gmelin